Luther Akisawa Wenge (born 12 December 1959) is a Papua New Guinean politician. He is Governor of Morobe Province and a member of the National Parliament of Papua New Guinea as a member of the Pipol First Party from 1997 to 2012. After 10 years, he reclaimed his old Parliamentary seat in the 2022 National Elections this time under the People's Labour Party.

Wenge worked as a lawyer and magistrate before entering politics. He was first elected to the National Parliament in the 1997 election. He was defeated by Kelly Naru at the 2012 election. Wenge ousted Ginson Goheyu Saonu at the 2022 National Elections to reclaim office.

One of his brothers, Kennedy Wenge, was also a member of the National Parliament, while another brother, Giegere Wenge, was the head bishop of the Evangelical Lutheran Church of Papua New Guinea.

References

1959 births
Governors of Morobe Province
Members of the National Parliament of Papua New Guinea
People's First Party (Papua New Guinea) politicians
Papua New Guinean lawyers
Papua New Guinean judges
Living people